Phyllocnistis is a genus of moths in the family Gracillariidae.

Description

Adult
Adults of the genus Phyllocnistis are very small moths with wingspans generally not exceeding 5 mm. Both fore- and hindwings are lanceolate and predominantly white. The forewings are marked with yellow to orange, longitudinal and oblique striae, often bordered by gray or black. A few species are known to possess much darker or strikingly color patterns. The compound eyes of Phyllocnistis are reduced, with an interocular index (vertical eye diameter/minimum interocular distance) of approximately 0.9. The maxillary palpi are the most reduced among Gracillariidae, being barely evident as vestigial, non-segmented lobes at the base of the elongate proboscis. The wing venation is also reduced.

Larvae
The larvae of Phyllocnistis are among the most specialized Lepidoptera. Four instars appear to be the norm, with the first three instars possessing a sapfeeding morphology and behavior. Sapfeeding instars create a long serpentine, subepidermal mine on either the upper or lower surfaces of the host leaf. A few species also form subepidermal mines on stems and various fruits, including avocado. A characteristic, median frass trail extends the length of the mine, usually as a dark, unbroken line. The fourth instar is a highly specialized, apodal, non-feeding instar whose primary function is to spin the cocoon, at the mine terminus, prior to pupation.

Pupae
In contrast to the conservative morphology of the larval and adult stages, the pupae of Phyllocnistis are structurally diverse, particularly with regard to the development of the frontal process (cocoon-cutter) of the head. In addition, the mid-dorsal areas of abdominal terga 3–7 possess a mostly symmetrical cluster of recurved spines that frequently differ in their arrangement and form among species.

Ecology
Phyllocnistis can be found on many host plants, and have been noted on plants from at least 20 families. One well-known species is the citrus leafminer (Phyllocnistis citrella), a pest of plants in the family Rutaceae, especially citrus.

Species
As of 2012, about 126 Phyllocnistis species have been described. This is probably a fraction of the true diversity of the genus, especially in the tropics, where there may be hundreds of species yet to be collected.

Phyllocnistis abatiae E. M. Hering, 1958
Phyllocnistis acmias Meyrick, 1906
Phyllocnistis ampelopsiella Chambers, 1871
Phyllocnistis amydropa Meyrick, 1934
Phyllocnistis argentella (Bradley, 1957)
Phyllocnistis argothea Meyrick, 1933
Phyllocnistis atractias Meyrick, 1906
Phyllocnistis atranota Meyrick, 1906
Phyllocnistis aurilinea Zeller, 1877
Phyllocnistis baccharidis E. M. Hering, 1958
Phyllocnistis bourquini Pastrana, 1960
Phyllocnistis breynilla Liu & Zeng, 1989
Phyllocnistis canariensis M. Hering, 1927
Phyllocnistis cassiella Ghesquière, 1940
Phyllocnistis chlorantica Seksyaeva, 1992
Phyllocnistis chrysophthalma Meyrick, 1915
Phyllocnistis cirrhophanes Meyrick, 1915
Phyllocnistis citrella Stainton, 1856
Phyllocnistis citronympha Meyrick, 1926
Phyllocnistis cornella Ermolaev, 1987
Phyllocnistis diaugella Meyrick, 1880
Phyllocnistis dichotoma Turner, 1947
Phyllocnistis diplomochla Turner, 1923
Phyllocnistis dorcas Meyrick, 1915
Phyllocnistis drimiphaga Kawahara, Nishida & Davis, 2009
Phyllocnistis echinodes Meyrick, 1926
Phyllocnistis embeliella Liu & Zeng, 1989
Phyllocnistis endoxa Meyrick, 1926
Phyllocnistis ephimera Turner, 1926
Phyllocnistis eurymochla Turner, 1923
Phyllocnistis exaeta Meyrick, 1926
Phyllocnistis exiguella van Deventer, 1904
Phyllocnistis extrematrix Martynova, 1955
Phyllocnistis finitima Braun, 1927
Phyllocnistis habrochroa Meyrick, 1915
Phyllocnistis hagnopa Meyrick, 1920
Phyllocnistis hapalodes Meyrick, 1906
Phyllocnistis helicodes Meyrick, 1916
Phyllocnistis humiliella van Deventer, 1904
Phyllocnistis hyperbolacma (Meyrick, 1931)
Phyllocnistis hyperpersea Davis and Wagner, 2011
Phyllocnistis insignis Frey & Boll, 1876
Phyllocnistis intermediella Busck, 1900
Phyllocnistis iodocella Meyrick, 1880
Phyllocnistis labyrinthella (Bjerkander, 1790)
Phyllocnistis leptomianta Turner, 1923
Phyllocnistis liquidambarisella Chambers, 1875
Phyllocnistis liriodendronella Clemens, 1863
Phyllocnistis longipalpa Davis and Wagner, 2011
Phyllocnistis loxosticha Bradley, 1965
Phyllocnistis lucernifera Meyrick, 1935
Phyllocnistis magnatella Zeller, 1873
Phyllocnistis magnoliella Chambers, 1878
Phyllocnistis maxberryi Kawahara, Nishida & Davis, 2009
Phyllocnistis meliacella Becker, 1974
Phyllocnistis micrographa Meyrick, 1916
Phyllocnistis minimella van Deventer, 1904
Phyllocnistis nepenthae M. Hering, 1931
Phyllocnistis nymphidia Turner, 1947
Phyllocnistis oxyopa Meyrick, 1918
Phyllocnistis perseafolia Davis and Wagner, 2011
Phyllocnistis pharetrucha Meyrick, 1921
Phyllocnistis phrixopa Meyrick, 1926
Phyllocnistis populiella Chambers, 1875
Phyllocnistis psychina Meyrick, 1906
Phyllocnistis puyehuensis Davis, 1994
Phyllocnistis ramulicola Langmaid & Corley, 2007
Phyllocnistis rotans Meyrick, 1915
Phyllocnistis saligna (Zeller, 1839)
Phyllocnistis sciophanta Meyrick, 1915
Phyllocnistis selenopa Meyrick, 1915
Phyllocnistis sexangula Meyrick, 1915
Phyllocnistis signata Meyrick, 1915
Phyllocnistis spatulata Meyrick, 1928
Phyllocnistis stereograpta Meyrick, 1934
Phyllocnistis subpersea Davis and Wagner, 2011
Phyllocnistis symphanes Meyrick, 1926
Phyllocnistis synglypta Meyrick, 1918
Phyllocnistis tectonivora Meyrick, 1936
Phyllocnistis temperatior Meyrick, 1936
Phyllocnistis tethys Moreira & Vargas, 2012
Phyllocnistis titania Meyrick, 1928
Phyllocnistis toparcha Meyrick, 1918
Phyllocnistis triortha Meyrick, 1906
Phyllocnistis triploca Meyrick, 1928
Phyllocnistis tropaeolicola Kawahara, Nishida & Davis, 2009
Phyllocnistis unipunctella (Stephens, 1834)
Phyllocnistis valentinensis M. Hering, 1936
Phyllocnistis vitegenella Clemens, 1859
Phyllocnistis vitella Ermolaev, 1987
Phyllocnistis vitifoliella Chambers, 1871
Phyllocnistis voutei M. Hering, 1932
Phyllocnistis wampella Liu & Zeng, 1985
Phyllocnistis wygodzinskyi E. M. Hering, 1958
Phyllocnistis xenia M. Hering, 1936

References

External links

Global Taxonomic Database of Gracillariidae (Lepidoptera)

 
Gracillarioidea genera